Periamphispora is a genus of fungi within the Lasiosphaeriaceae family. This is a monotypic genus, containing the single species Periamphispora phacelodes.

References

External links
Periamphispora at Index Fungorum

Lasiosphaeriaceae
Monotypic Sordariomycetes genera